John Morton (1725 – April 1, 1777) was an American farmer, surveyor, and jurist from the Province of Pennsylvania and a Founding Father of the United States. As a delegate to the Continental Congress during the American Revolution, he was a signatory to the Continental Association and Declaration of Independence. Morton provided the swing vote that allowed Pennsylvania to vote in favor of the Declaration. Morton chaired the committee that wrote the Articles of Confederation, though he died before signing.

Early life

Morton was born in Ridley Township, in Chester County, present-day Delaware County, Pennsylvania, in 1725, the exact month is unknown. Morton's great-grandfather  (or ) was a Finn with roots in Rautalampi, Finland. In 1653, Marttinen emigrated from the Swedish land of Finland—then a constituent part of the Realm of Sweden—bringing son Martti Jr. to the Swedish colony of New Sweden. The younger Marttinen's son Johan anglicized his name to become John Morton Sr., who died in 1724—shortly before the birth of his only son and namesake who would become the famed Finnish American statesman John Morton. His mother, Mary Archer, was also of Finnish descent.  When Morton was about seven years old, his mother married John Sketchley, a farmer of English ancestry, who raised Morton.

Political career
Morton was elected to the Pennsylvania Provincial Assembly in 1756. The following year he was also appointed justice of the peace, an office he held until 1764. He served as a delegate to the Stamp Act Congress in 1765. He resigned from the Assembly in 1766 to serve as sheriff of Chester County. He returned to the Assembly in 1769 and was elected speaker in 1775. Meanwhile, his judicial career reached its pinnacle with his appointment as an associate justice of the Supreme Court of Pennsylvania in 1774.

Morton was elected to the First Continental Congress in 1774 and the Second Continental Congress in 1775. He cautiously helped move Pennsylvania towards independence, though he opposed the radical Pennsylvania Constitution of 1776. When in June 1776 Congress began the debate on a resolution of independence, the Pennsylvania delegation was split, with Benjamin Franklin and James Wilson in favor of declaring independence, and John Dickinson and Robert Morris opposed. Morton was uncommitted until July 1, when he sided with Franklin and Wilson. When the final vote was taken on July 2, Dickinson and Morris abstained, allowing the Pennsylvania delegation to support the resolution of independence. Morton signed the Declaration on August 2 with most of the other delegates.

Morton was chairman of the committee that wrote the Articles of Confederation, although he died, probably from tuberculosis, before the Articles were ratified.

Legacy

Morton was the first signer of the Declaration of Independence to die and was buried in Old St. Paul's Church Burial Ground (also known as the Old Swedish Burial Ground) in Chester, Pennsylvania. Morton's grave remained unmarked until October 1845, when the present-day 11-foot marble obelisk was erected by his descendants.

The inscription on the west side of the memorial reads:

The inscription of the east side of the memorial reads:

The inscription on the south side of the memorial reads:

The inscription on the north side of the memorial reads:

John Morton's participation in the signing of the Declaration of Independence has been important in terms of the identity of Finnish Americans. In the early decades of the 20th century, Finnish immigrants had to face the question of who were "real Americans". They claimed to belong, through Delaware and Morton, to the "founding nationalities" of American history. An important role in the dissemination of information was played by amateur historian Reverend Salomon Ilmonen, who researched Delaware and John Morton for Delaware's 300th anniversary. Thanks to the Delaware colony and John Morton, American Finns' self-esteem rose and they celebrated the history of the Delaware colony spectacularly both in 1938 and in 1988.

50 John Morton researchers from around the world arrived in Rautalampi in June 2010 to research Morton's family roots. They got to know, among other things, the Delaware monument in the town. According to DNA research, Morton has a 99.56% probability of Finnish descent. His family roots from Savonia have also been confirmed by research. In July 2010, a restaurant Konttiravintola Morton, which was named after him, was opened in Rautalampi.

In 2013 University of Turku established the John Morton Center for North American Studies, after it was concluded that the field of studies regarding North America was fragmented and a national institute was needed.

Personal life
Morton married Ann Justis of Chester County, and together they had three sons and five daughters; Aaron, Sketchley, John, Mary, Sarah, Lydia, Ann and Elizabeth. Morton's second son, Sketchley, was a major in the Pennsylvania Militia of the Continental Army during the American Revolutionary War. Morton was an active member of the Anglican Church in Chester County.

See also
 Memorial to the 56 Signers of the Declaration of Independence

Notes

References 
Purcell, L. Edward. Who Was Who in the American Revolution. New York: Facts on File, 1993. .
 Warden, Rosemary. "Morton, John". American National Biography Online, February 2000.

Further reading
 Morton, John S. A History of the Origin of the Apellation Keystone State as Applied to the Commonwealth of Pennsylvania: Together with Extracts from Many Authorities Relative to the Adoption of the Declaration of Independence by the Continental Congress, July 4, 1776; To Which is Appended the New Constitution of Pennsylvania with an Alphabetical Contents. Philadelphia: Claxton, Remsen & Haffelfinger, 1874.

External links
 Historical Marker and Biography

 Mårten Mårtensson and his Morton Family by Dr. Peter Stebbins Craig
 John Morton Prize

1725 births
1777 deaths
People from Ridley Township, Pennsylvania
American Anglicans
American people of Finnish descent
Members of the Pennsylvania Provincial Assembly
Continental Congressmen from Pennsylvania
18th-century American politicians
Signers of the United States Declaration of Independence
Justices of the Supreme Court of Pennsylvania
Burials in Pennsylvania
People of colonial Pennsylvania
People from Delaware County, Pennsylvania
Patriots in the American Revolution
Signers of the Continental Association
18th-century deaths from tuberculosis
Tuberculosis deaths in Pennsylvania
Founding Fathers of the United States